Private Employment Agencies Convention, 1997 is  an International Labour Organization Convention.

It was established in 1997, with the preamble stating:
Recalling the provisions of the Forced Labour Convention, 1930, the Freedom of Association and Protection of the Right to Organise Convention, 1948, the Right to Organise and Collective Bargaining Convention, 1949, the Discrimination (Employment and Occupation) Convention, 1958, the Employment Policy Convention, 1964, the Minimum Age Convention, 1973, the Employment Promotion and Protection against Unemployment Convention, 1988, and the provisions relating to recruitment and placement in the Migration for Employment Convention (Revised), 1949, and the Migrant Workers (Supplementary Provisions) Convention, 1975, and

Having decided upon the adoption of certain proposals with regard to the revision of the Fee-Charging Employment Agencies Convention (Revised), 1949,...

This Convention applies to all private employment offices, to all categories of workers and to all branches of economic activity. It does not apply to the recruitment and accommodation of seafarers.
The purpose of the Convention is to enable all private employment agencies to operate and to ensure the protection of workers using their services within the limits of its provisions. According to the convention, private employment agencies have to treat all employees equally without discrimination because of race, color, sex, religion, political opinion, national exclusion or social origin.

Ratifications
As of March 2023, the convention has been ratified by 37 states. These states are:

References

External links 
Text.
Ratifications.

Employment agencies
International Labour Organization conventions
Treaties entered into force in 2000
Treaties concluded in 1997
Treaties of Albania
Treaties of Algeria
Treaties of Belgium
Treaties of Bosnia and Herzegovina
Treaties of Bulgaria
Treaties of the Czech Republic
Treaties of Ethiopia
Treaties of Fiji
Treaties of Finland
Treaties of France
Treaties of Georgia (country)
Treaties of Hungary
Treaties of Israel
Treaties of Italy
Treaties of Japan
Treaties of Lithuania
Treaties of Mali
Treaties of Moldova
Treaties of Mongolia
Treaties of Morocco
Treaties of the Netherlands
Treaties of Niger
Treaties of Panama
Treaties of Poland
Treaties of Portugal
Treaties of Serbia
Treaties of Slovakia
Treaties of Spain
Treaties of Suriname
Treaties of North Macedonia
Treaties of Uruguay
Treaties of Zambia
1997 in labor relations